Championship Motocross 2001 Featuring Ricky Carmichael is a video game developed by Tiertex Design Studios and Funcom Dublin and published by THQ for Game Boy Color and PlayStation. It is the second motocross racing game published by THQ to be endorsed by professional motorcross racer Ricky Carmichael, after Championship Motocross featuring Ricky Carmichael.

Reception

The PlayStation version received above-average reviews according to the review aggregation website Metacritic.

References

External links
 

2000 video games
Funcom games
Game Boy Color games
Motorcycle video games
PlayStation (console) games
THQ games
Video game sequels
Video games based on real people
Video games developed in Norway
Video games developed in Ireland
Tiertex Design Studios games
Multiplayer and single-player video games